Briggs & Riley Travelware is a manufacturer of luggage. The company is based in Hauppauge, New York and was founded in 1993 by Richard Costa. The company is known for its "Simple as that" lifetime guarantee that even covers damage caused by an airline. Briggs & Riley luggage can be purchased from independent retailers across the United States and Canada, as well as through its "online boutique".

The company was acquired in August 2000 by Richard Krulik and U.S. Luggage LLC. U.S. Luggage is also the parent company of Solo New York, a company that makes business cases.

Briggs & Riley manufactures a wide selection of travel bags. It was the first company to establish the NXpandable System that provides more space in the bag when expanded. It was also the first company to develop the Outsider handle, designed on the exterior of the case to ensure a flat packing area for wrinkle-free clothes.

Footnotes

Luggage manufacturers
Companies based in New York (state)